Orari may refer to:

Orari, New Zealand
Orari River, a river in New Zealand
Organisasi Amatir Radio Indonesia (ORARI), in English, Amateur Radio Organization of Indonesia